This is a survey of the postage stamps and postal history of the Cook Islands.

The Cook Islands are named after Captain James Cook, who visited the islands in 1773 and 1777. They became a British protectorate in 1888 and in 1900 administrative control was transferred to New Zealand. In 1965 residents chose self-government in free association with New Zealand. The Cook Islands contain 15 islands in the group spread over the South Pacific.

First stamps
The first stamps of the Cook Islands were issued on 7 May 1892.

Rarotonga issues

The stamps of the Cook Islands were inscribed "Rarotonga" from 1919 to 1932.

Since 2011, separate stamps for Rarotonga have also been issued by the Cook Islands.

See also
Postage stamps and postal history of Aitutaki
Postage stamps and postal history of Niue
Postage stamps and postal history of Penrhyn

References

Further reading 
Poole, B.W.H. The Stamps of Cook Islands. Boston: Mekeel-Severn-Wylie, 1912. (Mekeels Handbook #1)

External links
Cook Islands Philatelic Bureau
The Pacific Islands Study Circle.

Communications in the Cook Islands
History of the Cook Islands
Cook Islands